Taditui Rangkau Zeliang (born 21 February 1952) is an Indian politician who is currently serving as the Deputy Chief Minister of Nagaland since 2023. He has served twice as the Chief Minister of Nagaland, from May 2014 to February 2017 and from July 2017 to March 2018. A leader of the Naga People's Front,T. R. Zeliang previously served as a Member of Parliament, representing Nagaland in the Rajya Sabha, the upper house of the Indian Parliament. He served as the Chairman of United Democratic Alliance (Nagaland) and was former leader of the NPF Legislature Party and former Leader of Opposition in Nagaland Legislative Assembly.He represents the paren constituency in Nagaland Legislative Assembly since 2008.

Early life and education 
T. R. Zeliang was born to Rangleu Zeliang at Mbaupunggwa village under Peren District in 1952. A Zeme Naga, T. R. Zeliang matriculated from Don Bosco High School in Dibrugarh, Assam and served as the President of Zeliangrong Students Union, General Secretary of Zeliangrong Action Committee and Zeliangrong Youth Organisation while in college. He later entered politics and became the President of Peren District Youth Congress of the Indian National Congress.

Political career 
Zeliang contested the Nagaland Assembly elections of 1982 and 1987 unsuccessfully from 6 Tening Assembly Constituency. He then won from Tening four times in a row beginning with the elections of 1989 as a candidate of the Naga People's Council and subsequently in 1993, 1998 and 2003 as a candidate of the Indian National Congress. He served as Minister of State for Information and Tourism during 1989–90 and as Minister of State for Relief & Rehabilitation from 1994 to 1998. During 1998 – 2003, he was the Minister for Environment and Forests and Geology and Mining under the Ministry of S C Jamir. He formed Nagaland Congress in year 2003 and later merged it into Naga People's Front(NPF). From 2004 to 2008, he was a Member of Parliament to the Rajya Sabha from Nagaland. Returning to State politics in 2008, he was Minister for Planning, Geology and Mining, Animal Husbandry and Parliamentary Affairs under the Ministry of Neiphiu Rio. He contested State elections 9 times out of which he lost the first two elections and won the remaining 7. He won the assembly elections of 2008, 2013 and 2018 from Peren.

Chief Minister of Nagaland 
T. R. Zeliang was the Chief Minister of Nagaland from May 2014 to February 2017 and from July 2017 to March 2018 as 19th Chief Minister of Nagaland. Currently, with 26 legislators in a House of 60, T.R. Zeliang is the legislature leader of the Naga Peoples' Front, the single largest Party in Nagaland. In 2022 T.R. Zeliang became the Chairman of United Democratic Alliance (Nagaland) in the opposition less Government of Nagaland.

Deputy Chief Minister of Nagaland                                               
In 2023, he sworn as the deputy chief minister along with BJP's Yanthungo Patton.

References

External links
 Profile on Rajya Sabha website

|-

|-

1952 births
Living people
Rajya Sabha members from Nagaland
Naga people
People from Peren district
Chief Ministers of Nagaland
Don Bosco schools alumni
Naga People's Front politicians
Nagaland MLAs 2003–2008
Chief ministers from Naga People's Front politicians
Nagaland MLAs 1989–1992
Nagaland MLAs 1993–1998
Nagaland MLAs 1998–2003
Nagaland MLAs 2008–2013
Nagaland MLAs 2013–2018
Nagaland MLAs 2018–2023